Dhimsa is a tribal dance form that is performed primarily by Porja caste women in Andhra Pradesh
. 

15-20 महिलाओं का एक समूह एक मंडली बनाता है और अपने घरेलू जीवन के कल्याण के लिए देवता की स्तुति करता है। वे शादियों में भी नृत्य करते हैं क्योंकि महिलाएं शांतिपूर्ण और सुखी वैवाहिक जीवन के लिए प्रार्थना करती हैं। वे आम तौर पर आदिवासी कपड़े और गहने पहनते हैं जबकि प्रमुख महिला अपने हाथ में मोर पंख भी रखती है।.

Origin 
Dhimsa originated in Koraput district in the Odisha State, but has almost become an official dance of Visakhapatnam. Dhimsa means "sound of the foot steps". Dhimsa is in the groove with the culture of this region, especially with places near Araku Valley and Borra Caves.Earlier unmarried youth used to dance. There is no discrimination , people belonging to this tribe irrespective of the wealth they possess, the power etc,they feel united and participate in dhimsa.
It is generally played as a relief time during their working hours. Each dance movement resembles their daily activity like picking leaves or plants,farmming activities, tradition culture during matrimonial alliances, protecting them from wild life etc.

Style of dance 
This expressive dance is dominated by the movements of feet and hands of the group performing the dance in a circle. Though this dance can be performed by men and women, young and old, typically around 15-20 women form a chain and move their feet according to the rhythm and make formations of smaller to larger circles. There are several variations in this dance. The popular twelve variations are: 
1) Bhag Dhimisa 
2. Natikari Dhimsa
3. Kunda Dhimisa 
4. Pathartola Dhimisa
5. Pedda Dhimisa 
6. Sambor Nisani Dhimisa 
7. Bayya Dhimisa
8. Mouli Dhimisa 
8.Choti Dhimisa 
9. Boda Dhimsa  (Involves worship of their ritual goodness or god in villages.)
10. Goddi Beta Dimsa (Dancer moves both backward and forward with the swinging of body.)

Instruments 
The members play Dappu (drum with a short stick), Tudumu, Mori, Kiridi and Jodukommulu. The performers dance to the drum beats and usually the music is played by men.

Costume 
The attire is colorful with earthy tones of green, red and yellow. The dancers wear sarees that fall just below the knee. Their necks are adorned with tribal ornaments.

External links
http://www.visitvizag.in/dhimsa.asp
http://www.discoveredindia.com/andhra-pradesh/culture-in-andhra-pradesh/dance-in-andhra-pradesh/dhimsa.htm
http://www.thehindu.com/todays-paper/tp-national/tp-otherstates/dhimsa-dance-festival-inaugurated/article1204702.ece
http://www.indiantravelportal.com/andhra-pradesh/dances/dhimsa.html 

Dances of India
Circle dances